1996 is the first live album by the Danish progressive metal band Royal Hunt with singer D.C. Cooper. It was recorded during Royal Hunt tour in Japan promoting the album Moving Target and came out together with a VHS video of the show. The Japanese version of the album comes with three Royal Hunt guitar picks inside it.

Track listing
All songs written by André Andersen, except where noted.

Disc one
 "Flight" – 6:26
 "1348" – 4:55
 "Wasted Time" – 4:25
 "Stay Down" – 4:28
 "On the Run" – 3:45
 "Stranded" – 5:16
 "Keyboard Solo" (Instrumental) – 2:35
 "Martial Arts" (Instrumental) – 4:03
 "Far Away" – 5:43
 "Last Goodbye" – 5:42
 "Land of Broken Hearts" – 5:26
 "Makin' a Mess" – 3:59

Disc Two
 "Clown in the Mirror" – 5:23
 "Guitar Solo" (Instrumental) (Jacob Kjaer) – 2:53
 "Step by Step" – 4:14
 "Drum & Bass Solo" (Instrumental) (Kenneth Olsen, Steen Mogensen) – 4:23
 "Running Wild" – 6:26
 "Epilogue" – 9:11
 "Age Gone Wild" – 4:47
 "Ten to Life" – 5:13
 "Legion of the Damned" – 4:48
 "Kingdom Dark" – 6:30
 "Time" – 6:51
 "Restless" (Studio track) (Japanese bonus track)

Personnel
D.C. Cooper – vocals
André Andersen – keyboards, guitars
Jacob Kjaer – guitars, backing vocals
Steen Mogensen – bass, backing vocals
Kenneth Olsen – drums
with
Maria McTurk – backing vocals
Lise Hansen – backing vocals

Additional Info
Mixed and mastered at Medley Studio, Denmark by Lars Overgaard and Royal Hunt
Design & Artwork by Martin Burridge Design, Denmark

External links
Metal Archives page

Royal Hunt live albums
1996 live albums
Teichiku Records live albums